Raguvėlė is a village in Anykščiai district municipality, in Utena County, in northeast Lithuania. According to the 2011 census, the village has a population of 314 people. Village established near Juosta river.

Education
Raguvėlė primary school

References

Anykščiai District Municipality
Villages in Utena County